Ben Shulver, is an English professional rugby league footballer who has played in the 2010s for the Wakefield Trinity Wildcats in the Super League, Queanbeyan Kangaroos and Hunslet Club Parkside, as a  or .

Career
Shulver started his career with the Wakefield Trinity Wildcats, playing and scoring in one Challenge Cup match against Hemel Stags on 20 April 2013. During his first spell with the club, Ben failed to make his début in Super League.

During the 2015 season, Shulver played in Australia for Queanbeyan Kangaroos.

References

External links
Hunslet Club Parkside keep marching on
Wakefield Wildcats: Academy product Shulver pens full-time Wildcats contract

Living people
English rugby league players
Place of birth missing (living people)
Rugby league players from Leeds
Rugby league props
Rugby league second-rows
Wakefield Trinity players
Year of birth missing (living people)